Jan Łukasz Ołdakowski (born 11 May 1972 in Warsaw) is a Polish politician. He was elected to Sejm on 25 September 2005, getting 3939 votes in Warsaw I, standing for Law and Justice. He joined Poland Comes First when that party split from Law and Justice in 2010.

He is the director of the Warsaw Uprising Museum.

See also
 Members of Polish Sejm 2005-2007

External links

 Jan Ołdakowski - parliamentary page - includes declarations of interest, voting record, and transcripts of speeches.

1972 births
Living people
Politicians from Warsaw
Members of the Polish Sejm 2005–2007
Poland Comes First politicians
Law and Justice politicians
Directors of museums in Poland
University of Warsaw alumni
Recipients of the Silver Medal for Merit to Culture – Gloria Artis
Officers of the Order of Polonia Restituta
Members of the Polish Sejm 2007–2011
Recipients of the Order of the Cross of Terra Mariana, 4th Class